Penn Deivam is a 1970 Indian Tamil-language drama film, directed by M. A. Thirumugam and produced by Sandow M. M. A. Chinnappa Thevar. The film stars Jaishankar, Padmini, Lakshmi, R. Muthuraman and Major Sundarrajan. It was released on 22 January 1970. The film was remade in to Telugu as Inti Gouravam.

Plot

Cast 
Jaishankar as Police Inspector
Padmini as Ponnamma
Lakshmi as Lakshmi
R. Muthuraman as Muthuraman
Nagesh
V. S. Raghavan
Sachu
Udaya Chandrika
 K. R. Indira Devi
Thengai Srinivasan
Major Sundarrajan as Ponnamma's Husband
Baby Sridevi
Baby Sumathi

Soundtrack 
The music was composed by V. Kumar.

References

External links 
 

1970 films
1970s Tamil-language films
Films directed by M. A. Thirumugam
Indian drama films
Tamil films remade in other languages